Linux.Darlloz  is a worm which infects Linux embedded systems.

Linux.Darlloz was first discovered by Symantec in 2013.
Linux.Darlloz targets the Internet of things and infects routers, security cameras, set-top boxes by exploiting a PHP vulnerability.

The worm was based on a Proof of concept code that was released in October 2013.
Linux.Darlloz utilizes vulnerability to exploit systems in order to compromise systems.

Linux.Darlloz was later found in March 2014 to have started mining crypto currencies such as Mincoin and Dogecoin.

See also
 Botnet
 Mirai (malware)
 BASHLITE
 Remaiten
 Linux.Wifatch
 Hajime (malware)

References

IoT malware
Linux malware
Botnets